Celtic Woman: A New Journey is the third studio album by Celtic Woman, released worldwide on 30 January 2007.

Background
A New Journey was recorded with the Celtic Woman backing band led by musical director David Downes, the Irish Film Orchestra conducted by John Page, and the Aontas Choral Ensemble directed by Rosemary Collier.

The six principal performers on the album are vocalists Chloë Agnew, Órla Fallon, Lisa Kelly, Méav Ní Mhaolchatha, Hayley Westenra, and fiddler Máiréad Nesbitt. It is also the first - and only - album to introduce Westenra as a new addition to the group.

In preparation for the release of the album, a special concert event was held against the backdrop of Slane Castle in County Meath, Ireland on 23 and 24 August 2006. Footage from both shows were professionally recorded, and the concert, also entitled A New Journey, premiered on American television station PBS and The Walt Disney Company in December 2006, later being released on VHS and DVD formats on 30 January 2007 in conjunction with the album.

Track listing

Notes 
 Tracks 1, 6 and 17 (18 on Japanese special edition) were composed and written by David Downes and Brendan Graham.
 Track 5 was composed and written by David Downes and Máiréad Nesbitt.
 Tracks 19 (not on Japanese special edition) and 21 were composed by David Downes and written by Shay Healy.

Personnel 
Celtic Woman
 Chloë Agnew - vocals
 Órla Fallon - vocals, harp
 Lisa Kelly - vocals
 Méav Ní Mhaolchatha - vocals
 Hayley Westenra - vocals
 Máiréad Nesbitt - fiddle
Other musicians
 David Downes - keyboards, piano, grand piano, percussion, harpsichord, whistles, backing vocals, arranger
 Andreja Malir - concert harp
 Desmond Moore - bouzouki, guitar
 John O'Brien - uilleann pipes, whistles
 Eoghan O'Neill - bass guitar
 Raymond Fean - drums, percussion, bodhrán, additional vocals ("Dúlaman")
 Nicholas Bailey - percussion, bodhrán
 Robbie Harris - bodhrán
Aontas Choral Ensemble
 Rosemary Collier - choral director
The Irish Film Orchestra
 John Page - conductor
 Alan Smale - concertmaster

Charts and certifications
The album opened at number 4 on the U.S. Billboard 200, selling 71,000 copies in its first week.

Weekly charts

Year-end charts

Certifications

References

Celtic Woman albums
2007 albums
Manhattan Records albums
Films directed by Declan Lowney